The 1868 London University by-election was held on 21 December 1868.  The by-election was held due to the incumbent Liberal MP, Robert Lowe, becoming Chancellor of the Exchequer.  It was retained by Lowe who was unopposed.

References

London University by-election
London University by-election
London University,1868
London University,1868
Unopposed ministerial by-elections to the Parliament of the United Kingdom in English constituencies
History of the University of London
London University by-election